The Alf is a small river in Rhineland-Palatinate, Germany, a left tributary of the Moselle. It rises in the Eifel, near Darscheid, east of Daun. The Alf flows south through Mehren, Gillenfeld and Bausendorf, where it turns east to flow into the Moselle at the village of Alf.

Geography

Course 
The next section of the Alf, to Bausendorf, is very winding; it then turns towards the east and cuts through the south of the forest of Kondelwald, passing the villages of Kinderbeuern and Bengel. Around  beyond Bengel it changes course abruptly and swings north. Along its  course from source to mouth, the Alf descends through , giving it an average river bed gradient of 8.6‰.

Tributaries

References

Rivers of Rhineland-Palatinate
Rivers of the Eifel
Rivers of Germany